Halber Mensch (also known as 1/2 Mensch) is a 1986 film by Japanese director Sogo Ishii with German band Einstürzende Neubauten. It was originally released on VHS, and re-released on DVD in 2005. The film's title comes from the album of the same name.

The one-hour film documents Einstürzende Neubauten's visit to Japan in 1985. It includes concert footage along with scenes of the band performing in an industrial building. Several songs from the "Halber Mensch" album are presented as music videos, some with accompanying Butoh dancers.

According to DVDManiacs, the DVD was originally mastered from a VHS tape, and the quality is therefore not as high as a usual DVD. The band, due to disputes with the manager of the label involved, have since released a remastered DVD on their own label.

References

External links
 
 Release data for VHS and DVD on brainwashed.com

1986 films
Einstürzende Neubauten
Films directed by Sōgo Ishii
Japanese documentary films
Documentary films about music and musicians